The De Riancey was a French automobile manufactured from 1898 until around 1901.  A front-wheel-drive voiturette, it used an air-cooled flat-twin engine.

References 
David Burgess Wise, The New Illustrated Encyclopedia of the Automobile

Defunct motor vehicle manufacturers of France